Robert Wise (1914–2005) was an American film producer and director.

Robert Wise may also refer to:

Bob Wise (born 1948), U.S. governor of West Virginia
Robert Russell "Chubby" Wise (1915–1996), American bluegrass fiddler
Robert C. Wise (born 1925), Pennsylvania politician
Robert Wise, chairman and managing director of the Wise Music Group (formerly Music Sales Group), sheet music publishers 
Robert E. Wise, American architect, founder of the Cramer, Bartlett & Wise firm in Los Angeles in the early 1900s